Chris Geith is an American composer and arranger of contemporary jazz and New Age music. His band, The Chris Geith Group, signed with Jive Records in Asia in 2001. The band has been no. 1 in the contemporary jazz, Jazz Fusion, and Contemporary Urban/ R&B charts on MP3.com. In 1995 Keyboard Magazine awarded him the top spot for his composition "Sunrise Hunter" at their 20th Anniversary Keyboard Competition.  His music can be heard on The Weather Channel, Music Choice cable, Sirius XM radio, and on a number of different national TV shows including VH1 (Behind The Music); Inside Fame, PBS (Hometime); Discovery Health (Berman & Berman For Women Only); Speed Channel (Autoline Detroit, My Classic Car); Animal Planet - (That's My Baby); Super Station (Famous Homes & Hideaways), and on TV and radio commercials for clients like Toyota, IBM, Supermodel.com and others.

Discography 
Prime Time  (2006)
 Timeless World (2008)
  Island Of A Thousand Dreams (2010)
 Chasing Rainbows (2014)

See also
The Weather Channel Presents: Smooth Jazz II
 List of jazz arrangers

References

External links 
 
 
 Interview

Living people
Year of birth missing (living people)
Composers for piano
American jazz composers
American male jazz composers
Smooth jazz pianists
Male pianists
21st-century pianists
21st-century American male musicians